Jakub Hrstka (born 17 March 1990) is a Czech handball player for Dessau Rosslauer HV 06 and the Czech national team.

References

External links

1990 births
Living people
Czech male handball players
People from Zubří
Expatriate handball players
Czech expatriate sportspeople in Germany
Czech expatriate sportspeople in Slovakia
Sportspeople from the Zlín Region